The Batang Hari (Indonesian: Sungai Batanghari) is the longest river in Jambi province, Sumatra island, Indonesia, about  northwest of the capital Jakarta.

Hydrology 
The river originates in the Minangkabau Highlands, home of the Minangkabau people, and flows to the east coast of Sumatra.  Trans-Sumatran Highway (AH25) crosses the river at the city of Jambi which is located near the mouth of the river. The river is used by the local population for fish cultivation, transportation, mining, and personal hygiene.

Geography
The river flows in the central area of Sumatra with predominantly tropical rainforest climate (designated as Af in the Köppen–Geiger climate classification). The average annual rainfall is 2383–3183 mm. The wettest month is December, with an average of  rainfall, and the driest is August, with 90 mm rainfall.

See also
List of rivers of Indonesia
List of rivers of Sumatra

References

External links

Rivers of Jambi
Rivers of West Sumatra
Rivers of Indonesia